The National Museum in Gdańsk, established in 1972 in Gdańsk (although the history goes back the third quarter of 19th century), is one of the main branches of Poland's national museum system.

History
Its main location is in the old late-Gothic Franciscan monastery, which has been used to house exhibits since the end of the 19th century. During that period it was known as Danziger Stadtmuseum, which held a sizeable collection of historical works of art. In 1884, the collection was enlarged with exhibits from the Danziger Kunstgewerbemuseum when the two institutions merged. The core of the Museum's collection constitutes the collection of Jacob Kabrun, which includes several thousand pictures, drawings and prints by European masters from the end of the fifteenth to the beginning of the nineteenth centuries.

After the end of the Second World War, 65% of the main building of the museum was destroyed and much of the museum's collections were lost, including all the numismatic exhibits as well as works of art from the Far East. Also the library and some of the museum's records were lost or destroyed. The first post-war exhibition was opened in 1948 and the museum changed its name to "Pomeranian Museum in Gdańsk". In 1956, Hans Memling's masterpiece Last Judgment returned to Gdańsk as well as part of the collections of paintings and prints. Originally the museum was located in the Opatów Palace in Oliwa and constituted the ethnographic department of the museum. Since 1989, the palace houses the museum's collection of modern art.

A number of other museums were established from the rich collections of the Pomeranian Museum, which include: National Maritime Museum (1960), the Archeological Museum (1962) and the Gdańsk Historical Museum (1971). In 1972, it was renamed as the National Museum in Gdańsk.

In 2017, the museum attracted 162,137 visitors.

Departments

Currently the museum has seven departments:
Department of Ancient Art, contains Hans Memling's Last Judgment
Department of Modern Art, in the Opatów Palace in Oliwa
Green Gate Department
Gdańsk Photography Gallery
Museum of the National Anthem in Będomin
Museum of Szlachta Traditions in Waplewo Wielkie

Museum directors

Jan Chranicki (1948-1970)
Janusz Wąsowicz (1970-1974)
Jan Przała (1974-1980)
Józef Kuszewski (1980-1983)
Teresa Milewska (1983-1988)
Tadeusz Piaskowski (1988-2004)
Wojciech Bonisławski (2004-2019)
Jacek Friedrich (2020)

Gallery

See also
List of registered museums in Poland

External links

References

Art museums and galleries in Poland
Museums in Gdańsk
National museums of Poland
Registered museums in Poland
Museums established in 1972
1972 establishments in Poland